Kothaiseri is a village located in Tirunelveli District, Tamil Nadu, India.

Villages in Tirunelveli district